Drajna is a commune in Prahova County, Muntenia, Romania. It is composed of eleven villages: Cătunu, Ciocrac, Drajna de Jos, Drajna de Sus (the commune centre), Făget, Ogretin, Piatra, Pițigoi, Plai, Podurile, and Poiana Mierlei.

The river Drajna flows through the commune; it discharges into the Teleajen in Piatra.

Natives
 Mihai Drăgănescu (1929—2010), engineer, President of the Romanian Academy (1990—1994)
 Dumitru Enescu (1930–2012), geophysicist and engineer

References

Drajna
Localities in Muntenia